The Sully Beds is a geologic formation in Wales. It preserves fossils dating back to the Triassic period.

See also 

 List of fossiliferous stratigraphic units in Wales

References 

Geologic formations of Wales
Triassic System of Europe
Triassic Wales